David Kano (born January 7, 1987) is an American actor, writer, producer, director, journalist, model, and reporter. He started his entertainment career in commercial and print modeling for Nike, K-Swiss, and appeared as a lead in an NCAA Men's Basketball commercial on CBS. He wrote, produced, and acted in the comedy Blaxican Brothers (2011), and followed that up with the anti-bullying short film A Perfect Prank in 2012.

Career
In 2009 Kano partnered up with Joe Grande from Big Boy's Neighborhood on Power 106 to create 7 Day Films where he wrote, produced, and acted in the feature film Blaxican Brothers which starred platinum artist Cayce Clayton from US5 and featured Stressmatic from The Federation.

Kano was hired by Examiner in 2010 as the San Fernando Food Examiner and he covered a wide range of food stories from Square Dancing eateries to recipes and restaurant critiques.

In the summer of 2010, Kano wrote a serious drama A Perfect Prank which dealt with teen suicide and bullying. The film went into production in early 2011 and had a Hollywood screening in the Summer. The film received praise from Big Boy, Anjelah Johnson, DJ Felli Fel, Billy Ray, and was recognized by Mayor Art Madrid as having a significant impact on the youth.

In 2013, Kano was hired by TradioV to host 'The Hollywood MMA Show' in a live streaming format which was one of the top viewed shows on the network. In Summer 2013, Kano was brought on to direct his first project, the Lodi Cyclefest, which was a mini-documentary and premiered in Lodi, California.

TV Mix, headed by Owen Phillips, former executive editor of The Hollywood Reporter, hired Kano in 2014 to become the lead writer and reporter for MMA and boxing.

In an interview in October 2015, Kano said he would be joining Alki David's network FilmOn TV on a new MMA channel.

Currently, Kano is working on a feature documentary covering concussions and chronic traumatic encephalopathy in sports.

Personal life
Kano resides in Los Angeles, California and holds a bachelor's degree in Broadcast Journalism and master's degree in Mass Communication.

References

1987 births
Living people
American film producers
American male actors
American male journalists
Male models from California
American male screenwriters
California State University, Northridge alumni